Paul van Geert is a Dutch linguist. He is currently a professor of developmental psychology at the University of Groningen, Netherlands. He is renowned for his work on developmental psychology and the application of dynamical systems theory in social science.

He is one of the members of the "Dutch School of Dynamic Systems" who proposed to apply time series data to study second language development along with de Bot, Lowie, and Verspoor.

Career 
Between 1967 and 1971 van Geert studied psychology and educational sciences at the Ghent University, Belgium. In 1975 he was awarded with a PhD in Developmental psychology. In 1976 he became a lecturer at the University of Groningen.

In 1976 he was appointed as a Lecturer and in 1978 he became a Senior Lecturer at the University of Groningen. Between 1978 and 1979 he was a fellow at the Netherlands Institute of Advanced Studies in the Humanities and Social Sciences. In 1985 he was appointed as a Professor of Psychology and a Chair of Developmental Psychology at the University of Groningen. Between 1990 and 1992 he was the Dean of the Department of Psychology at the University of Groningen. Between 1992 and 1993 he was a fellow at the Center for Advanced Study in the Behavioral Sciences at Stanford University in California.

Work
Paul van Geert was the first to apply the logistic function to model first language development in 1991.

He developed a Microsoft Excel VBA code to model developmental data in 2003.

In 2002 he created new techniques and methods to measure the degree of variability by applying min-max graphs, resampling techniques, and Monte Carlo method along with Marijn van Dijk.

Supervision
He supervised his future colleague at the University of Groningen, Marijn van Dijk, who obtained her PhD Degree in 2004. The title of her Phd Thesis was Child Language Cuts Capers: Variability and Ambiguity in Early Child Development.

Bibliography

Books
A Dynamic Systems Model of Cognitive and Language Growth (1991)
Dynamic Systems of Development: Change between Complexity and Chaos (1994)

Articles
"A dynamic systems model of cognitive and language growth." (1991)
"A dynamic systems model of basic developmental mechanisms: Piaget, Vygotsky, and beyond." (1998)
"The dynamics of general developmental mechanisms: From Piaget and Vygotsky to dynamic systems models." (2000)
"Focus on variability: New tools to study intra-individual variability in developmental data." (2002)
"Dynamic systems approaches and modeling of developmental processes." (2003)
"Explaining after by before: Basic aspects of a dynamic systems approach to the study of development." (2005)
"The dynamics of scaffolding." (2005)
"Wobbles, humps and sudden jumps: A case study of continuity, discontinuity and variability in early language development." (2007)
"Time and identity: A framework for research and theory formation." (2008)
"The dynamic systems approach in the study of L1 and L2 acquisition: An introduction." (2008)

References

External links 
 Professor van Geert on the University of Groningen's website: https://web.archive.org/web/20180120065650/https://www.rug.nl/staff/p.l.c.van.geert/

1950 births
Living people
Applied linguists
Psycholinguists
Linguists from Belgium
Ghent University alumni
Geert, Paul
People from Temse